The 1876–77 tour of Australia and New Zealand was at the time considered to be another professional first-class cricket tour of the colonies, as similar tours had occurred previously, but retrospectively it became classified as the first Test cricket tour of Australia by the English cricket team. The English team is sometimes referred to as James Lillywhite's XI. In all, they played 23 matches but only three including the two Tests are recognised as first-class. The first match started at the Adelaide Oval on 16 November 1876 and the last at the same venue on 14 April 1877. There were fifteen matches in Australia and, between January and March, eight in New Zealand.

A rival tour had been proposed by Fred Grace but was cancelled, enabling most of the best players of the Australian colonies to participate in two matches against James Lillywhite's side. Fred Spofforth, widely regarded as the best Australian fast bowler, controversially withdrew from the first match in protest over the omission of Billy Murdoch as wicket-keeper. Starting on 15 March 1877 the two sides played two matches, later designated Test matches, and the series was drawn 1-1.

For more details about the establishment of Test cricket, see the first Test tour: 1876/7. Although both matches have Test status, this series is not considered to be part of The Ashes, which began in 1882.

Squads

Ted Pooley was also a member of the English touring party, but had had to be left behind in New Zealand after he was charged with assault.

Matches

First Test

Second Test

Records

Individual records

Team records

Other records
 Alfred Shaw (Eng) bowled the first ball in Test cricket.
 Charles Bannerman (Aus) faced the first ball in Test cricket.
 Charles Bannerman (Aus) scored the first run in Test cricket.
 Ned Gregory (Aus) took the first duck in Test cricket.
 Charles Bannerman (Aus) scored the first century in Test cricket.
 Charles Bannerman (Aus) scored 69.6% of his team's match runs, still a world record.
 Allen Hill (Eng) took the first wicket in Test cricket.
 Allen Hill (Eng) took the first catch in Test cricket.
 Billy Midwinter (Aus) took the first five-wicket haul in Test cricket.
 Jack Blackham (Aus) took the first catch by a wicket-keeper in Test cricket.
 Jack Blackham (Aus) effected the first stumping in Test cricket.
 Alfred Shaw (Eng) was the first Englishman to have taken a five-wicket haul in Test cricket.
 Australia is the first team to have won a Test match.

External links
 CricketArchive – tour itinerary. Retrieved 24 May 2014.

1876 in Australian cricket
1876 in English cricket
1877 in Australian cricket
1877 in English cricket
1877 in New Zealand cricket
1876
1876
1877
International cricket competitions from 1844 to 1888
New Zealand cricket seasons from 1863–64 to 1889–90
March 1877 sports events
April 1877 sports events